Beaupre or Beaupré may refer to:

Beaupre (surname), surname found mostly in Canada, the United States and parts of England
Beaupré, Quebec, a ville in the Canadian province of Quebec
Sainte-Anne-de-Beaupré, Quebec, a town near Quebec city, Canada
Basilica of Sainte-Anne-de-Beaupré, a Roman Catholic sanctuary
Old Beaupre Castle, a ruined manor house near Cowbridge, Wales
Beaupré Cove, a cove in Graham Land, Antarctica
Beaupre Hall, a former home of the Beaupres in Outwell, Norfolk, England, demolished in 1966
 The Beaupre parachute system used by the United States Air Force in Project Excelsior, 1959–1960